Elizabeth Greene (born 3 February 1941) is a Canadian former alpine skier who competed in the 1960 Winter Olympics.

References

1941 births
Living people
Canadian female alpine skiers
Olympic alpine skiers of Canada
Alpine skiers at the 1960 Winter Olympics